Roque José Antonio del Sagrado Corazón de Jesús Sáenz Peña Lahitte (19 March 1851 – 9 August 1914) was an Argentine politician and lawyer who served as President of Argentina from 12 October 1910 to his death in office on 9 August 1914. 

He was the son of former president Luis Sáenz Peña. He was a candidate for an internal line called "modernist" within the National Autonomist Party.

He was responsible for passing Law 8871, known as "Sáenz Peña Law", which greatly reformed the Argentine electoral system, making the vote secret, universal and compulsory for males over 18. This effectively ended the rule by electoral fraud of the conservative Argentine oligarchy, and paved the way for the rise of the Radical Civic Union in the first free elections of the country.

Early life 

Roque Sáenz Peña was the son of Luis Sáenz Peña and Cipriana Lahitte. He came from a family of supporters of Rosas: his paternal and maternal grandparents, Roque Julián Sáenz Peña and Eduardo Lahitte, had been deputies of the Legislature during his government. After the defeat of Rosas in the Battle of Caseros, the federal tradition of the grandparents and the father, who did not change their convictions, kept them away from public service. He completed his secondary studies at the National School of Buenos Aires, under the direction of Amadeo Jacques. In 1875 he graduated as a doctor of law, with a thesis on "Legal status of foundlings." 

During the Revolution of 1874 he defended the authorities of the nation as Captain of Regiment, under the command of Luis María Campos. After the revolution, he was promoted to Second Commander of National Guards, but requested to be relieved of the ranks. Opponent of Bartolomé Mitre, he was a member of the Autonomist Party headed by Adolfo Alsina and in 1876 he was elected to a Deputy seat in the Legislature of the Province of Buenos Aires. He came to serve as president of the body at the age of 26, thus being one of the youngest presidents of the House. In 1877 he founded the Republican Party, together with Leandro Alem, Aristóbulo del Valle, Hipólito Yrigoyen, Lucio Vicente López, Pedro Goyena, José Manuel Estrada and Francisco Uriburu.

In 1878, as a result of the dissidents produced within the autonomism due to the conciliation policy initiated by President Nicolás Avellaneda to which Sáenz Peña was opposed, he resigned from his position and ended up temporarily abandoning politics.

On 4 February 1887, he married Rosa Isidora González Delgado, daughter of the Mendoza politician Lucas González and Rosa Delgado ibarbaltz, in the Basilica of Our Lady of Pilar (Buenos Aires).

War of the Pacific 
The War of the Pacific (La Guerra del Pacífico) pitted Chile against an allied Bolivia and Peru. Later, Argentina secretly joined the alliance. The dispute was over territory on the Pacific coast that had never been resolved, specifically control of a part of the Atacama Desert. The area contained high amounts of sodium nitrate which is a valuable mineral resource.

During the war, Sáenz Peña left Argentina to fight with the Peruvians. His main motivation was not patriotic or to show solidarity, but rather to escape Buenos Aires due to an unrequited love affair. After his superior officers had been killed in the Battle of Arica he assumed their roles and commanded a very weak Peruvian division. Sáenz Peña was captured after the Peruvians' defeat at the battle and imprisoned briefly by the Chileans.

He also served in the War of the Pacific as a lieutenant colonel of the Peruvian Army, and was made prisoner by Chile for six months following the Battle of Arica.

Rise to power 
When Sáenz Peña returned to Buenos Aires he was appointed sub-secretary of the Ministry of Foreign Relations under Minister of Foreign Relations Bernardo de Irigoyen in 1880. He soon left politics only to return in 1887 when he accepted the ministership to Uruguay. He represented Argentina at the 1888 Montevideo Congress. Sáenz Peña held firm to his legal and political doctrines and definitively stated that Argentine was immune to any action taken by the assembly.

Along with Manuel Quintana, Sáenz Peña represented Argentina in the first Pan American Conference in 1889. The two delegates made a 40-day journey to New York and then a four-day trip to Washington for the meeting that was taking placed in the State Department building. The Argentine delegation boycotted the opening meeting over, as they saw it, a violation of diplomatic custom. Custom requires a delegate from an invited country to preside over the conference, but  the U.S. Secretary of State was elected to be the permanent chair of the conference.

The delegates attended the second session. Throughout the conference Sáenz Peña advocated against an American free trade area. Nevertheless, the United States and twelve nations voted for a “recommendation to work for inter-American reciprocity treaties.” Only Argentina, Chile, and Bolivia voted against it.

During Sáenz Peña's tenure as foreign minister, he traveled the world and effectively argued for policies that benefited Argentina. He also performed traditional ceremonial duties, like in 1906 when he attended the wedding of Spanish king Alfonso XIII. He worked with the Italian government to increase trade while providing them with official cables from Argentina telling of the economic developments within the country. He distributed these cables to other European governments and businessmen as well. Before his presidency, Sáenz Peña served as ambassador to Spain (1906–1907) and Italy (1907–1910).

Presidency 

The electoral act that led Roque Sáenz Peña to the presidency of Argentina took place on 13 March 1910, with a large number of irregularities common at that time. The new president had not even participated in the electoral campaign: he was the Argentine ambassador to Italy. A single list of elector candidates participated in the elections, of which ten - out of 273 - did not vote for Sáenz Peña.

Days before assuming the presidency, Sáenz Peña met with President Figueroa Alcorta and with the leader of the opposition, Hipólito Yrigoyen. In this last interview, the radical leader promised to abandon the revolutionary path, and Sáenz Peña to promulgate an electoral law that would modernize the elections and prevent electoral fraud. Yrigoyen requested the intervention of the provinces to prevent their governors from interfering with said process, Sáenz Peña refused but allowed radicalism to be part of the government.

Governance management 

On 12 October 1910, Roque Sáenz Peña assumed the presidency of Argentina. In his first inaugural address he declared: “My international policy if known to you. It will be friendship for Europe and fraternity for America.” He came into power without the support of his own party, like his father. Sáenz Peña was elected while tensions were high in 1910 while promising electoral reform to curb the power of the oligarchy and to prevent a revolution.

In 1912 - at the initiative of the Minister of Agriculture, Ezequiel Ramos Mexía - Law 5,599, on the Promotion of National Territories, was enacted. Most of the national territories had the vast majority of their population concentrated on their maritime or fluvial coastline; For this reason, the law provided - and to a great extent succeeded - the construction of a large number of railway branches, which would allow the establishment of its population towards the interior. Branches were built in the national territories of Chaco, Formosa, Río Negro, Chubut and Santa Cruz; and a railroad branch even reached Posadas, the capital of Misiones.

On 10 August 1912, he signed the decree for the creation of the Military Aviation School (EMA), together with G. Vélez, according to the official bulletin 692-2 part). In the same it was established that in the meantime there would be no military personnel trained in Aerostation and Aviation, the Technical Directorate would be in charge of the Argentine Aeroclub and the Military Directorate in charge of the Chief of the Argentine Army with the title of Director of the School of Military Aviation .

The cry of Alcorta 

In June 1912 a great protest movement broke out among the tenant farmers against the worsening of the conditions of their contracts with the owners of the fields they worked, known as the Grito de Alcorta. It spread throughout the Pampas region and ended with a massive drop in rents. It marked the irruption of a portion of the rural middle class, formed by the farmers, in the national politics of the 20th century. But at the same time, a gradual trend towards the owners' own administration of the fields began, who began to consider the presence of tenants dangerous.

The Sáenz Peña Law 
Sáenz Peña was a convinced democrat; He thought that, freed from professional politicians, the people would elect the best for their government. He was also concerned about the social question, that is, about the possibility that - apart from politics - the workers could adhere to anarchism or socialism. Finally, he feared that the huge proportion of the foreign population, who did not participate in any way in politics, could fall into maximalist positions or remain a foreign body in society. For all these reasons he supported political reform based on universal and free voting.

Given the history of pressure on the voters - who voted aloud - the only possibility of electoral freedom was secret suffrage, through ballots written in sealed envelopes. And to ensure that no one was prevented from voting, he also made it universal and mandatory. The military registry would be used as the electoral roll. On the other hand, the participation of the population in the elections was very low, barely exceeding 20% of potential voters.

Sáenz Peña presented the project in Congress with these words: "I have told my country all my thoughts, my convictions and my hopes. May my country listen to the word and the advice of its first president, let the people vote."

The person in charge of designing the project and defending it in Congress was the Minister of the Interior, the Catholic Indalecio Gómez. He had to face stiff resistance from conservative deputies, whose privileges were clearly threatened by the reform, and who did not know any other way of doing politics. Thus, many legislators from the conservative sectors, still not openly opposing it, obstruct the reform. After a month of discussion in the Chamber of Deputies and a week in the Senate, the Sáenz Peña Law was approved and promulgated on 13 February 1912.

The law was a great advance in its time since it allowed large masses of the population to participate in the electoral act, although it was still far from being completely universal: women and foreigners - who at that time were a large part of society - still had no right to vote. Although they did not vote, they were instead taken into account when determining the population of the districts and the number of deputies that could be elected by each one.

The first test of the Law in operation was in a provincial election: the Province of Santa Fe was intervened by the government, which ordered the holding of the governor's elections in accordance with the Sáenz Peña Law; the UCR abandoned abstentionism and participated, achieving victory. Shortly after, he obtained a new victory in the deputy elections in the City of Buenos Aires, in an election in which popular participation amounted to 62.85% of the electoral roll; the Socialist Party also obtained a notable growth in them.

Death 

From the time of the assumption of Roque Sáenz Peña as president, his health was not good, but it worsened significantly from the year 1913. The version that circulated at the time was that the president suffered the neurological consequences of syphilis that was it would have been infected during the War of the Pacific. Starting in 1913, Sáenz Peña took a leave of absence, internally delegating the mandate to Victorino de la Plaza.

Sáenz Peña was the only president who lived in the Casa Rosada because of his sensitive health that prevented him from traveling with his cart from home. He adopted a sector as his home and had heating, rugs, rocking chairs and stained glass installed. During the last days of his life, Sáenz Peña remarked “I have lost almost all my friends, but I have governed for the Republic.” 

He died 3 years and 301 days after assuming the presidency, on 9 August 1914. He was buried the next day in the Recoleta Cemetery in Buenos Aires.

Legacy

Sáenz Peña is known today for his electoral reform and his fierce determination to protect the interests of Argentina abroad. In Argentina, mainly in Buenos Aires, he is also very honored, having streets, avenues and towns with his name. An example of this is:

 The President Roque Sáenz Peña Avenue in Buenos Aires.
 The subway station Sáenz Peña in Buenos Aires, Province.
 City Presidencia Roque Sáenz Peña in Chaco.
 Department Presidente Roque Sáenz Peña in Córdoba.

among others.

The figure of Roque Sáenz Peña -as a soldier- is very remembered in Peru, where many cities in this country have a street with the name of Sáenz Peña and there are monuments to his memory. In Rio de Janeiro, his name is remembered in Plaza Sáenz Peña.

Honours

Decorations 

 :
  Grand Cross of the Legion of Honour (6 May 1913)

References

Bibliography 
 Botana, Natalio R., Ezequiel Gallo, and Ian Barnett. 2013. Liberal Thought In Argentina, 1837-1940. 1st ed. Indianapolis: Liberty Fund.

 
 Cibotti, Ema. 2011. Historias Mínimas De Nuestra Historia. 1st ed. Buenos Aires: Aguilar, Alfaguara, Altea, Taurus.
 McSpadden, Joseph Walker. 1912. Official Digest Of The World: American Statesman's Year-Book, A Supplement To All Encyclopedias, Embracing The Latest Statistics, Records, And Current History Of Every State And Current History Of Every State And Country. P.F. Collier & Son.
 "Presidencia De Roque Saenz Peña". 2017. Accessed 1 March. http://www.todo-argentina.net/historia/gen80/SaenzPena(1910-1916)/index.html.
 "Revolución De 1874". 2017. Es.Wikipedia.Org. https://es.wikipedia.org/wiki/Revolución_de_1874.
 Rock, David. 1985. Argentina, 1516-1982. 1st ed. Berkeley: University of California Press.
 "Roque Sáenz Peña". 2017. Britannica Academic. Encyclopædia Britannica.
 "Roque Sáenz Peña". 2017. Biografías Y Vidas. La Enciclopedia Biografía en Línea.
 The Editors of Encyclopædia Britannica. 2007. "War Of The Pacific". Encyclopædia Britannica. Encyclopædia Britannica, inc.

External links
 index.html La presidencia de Roque Sáenz Peña 1910-1914.
  Accidente de Roque Sáenz Peña en 1905 (Lima).
 Rulers.org

 
 

|-

Presidents of Argentina
1851 births
1914 deaths
19th-century Argentine lawyers
Ambassadors of Argentina to Spain
Ambassadors of Argentina to Italy
Ambassadors of Argentina to Uruguay
National Autonomist Party politicians
Children of presidents of Argentina
People from Buenos Aires
Military personnel of the War of the Pacific
University of Buenos Aires alumni
Burials at La Recoleta Cemetery
20th-century Argentine politicians
Foreign ministers of Argentina